The Edward Via College of Osteopathic Medicine (VCOM) is a private medical school on the campus of Virginia Tech in Blacksburg, Virginia (VCOM-Virginia), with branch campuses in Spartanburg, South Carolina (VCOM-Carolinas), Auburn, Alabama (VCOM-Auburn) and Monroe, Louisiana (VCOM-Monroe). VCOM also recently added Bluefield University to its list of campuses. Founded in 2002, VCOM graduated its first class of 139 students in June 2007.

According to the U.S. News & World Report, VCOM is currently the second largest medical school in the U.S., with a total enrollment of 2,122 students among its four campuses.

VCOM is one of a growing number of osteopathic medical schools in the United States, which grant the Doctor of Osteopathic Medicine degree (DO), and one of four located in the Appalachian region. VCOM is fully accredited by the American Osteopathic Association's Commission on Osteopathic College Accreditation.

History
The school was founded in 2001, when Virginia Tech and the Harvey W. Peters Research Foundation worked together to start up a new private school of osteopathic medicine called the Edward Via Virginia College of Osteopathic Medicine (VCOM).  In June 2007, VCOM graduated its inaugural class of 139 students.  The college was originally named the Edward Via Virginia College of Osteopathic Medicine, which was later shortened to its present name.

VCOM is incorporated as a private, non-profit institution and has a collaborative agreement with Virginia Tech and Auburn University for education, research, and student activities.

In 2010, the school founded its second campus in Spartanburg, South Carolina, with classes starting in September 2011. VCOM-Carolinas graduated its first class in May 2015.

In 2012, the school announced plans to establish a third campus in collaboration with Auburn University in Auburn, Alabama, with classes starting in the fall of 2015.

Medical graduates of VCOM receive a Doctor of Osteopathic Medicine (D.O.) degree and obtain medical licensure by the same boards as graduates with an MD by participating in the same residency programs as their MD peers. The osteopathic curriculum entails additional training in a technique called osteopathic manipulative medicine besides conventional medicine and surgery. While graduates of VCOM may pursue any field of medicine, students typically pursue primary care to serve a rural population.

Mission
The mission of the school is to alleviate the critical shortage of physicians in Appalachia by training medical students to become patient-centered physicians who focus on evidence-based medicine. The school places emphasis on recruiting students from a rural Appalachian background, particularly the rural sections of central and southwestern Virginia, Piedmont North Carolina, upstate South Carolina, and Alabama."The MISSION of the Edward Via College of Osteopathic Medicine (VCOM) is to prepare globally-minded, community-focused physicians to meet the needs of rural and medically underserved populations and promote research to improve human health." - from VCOM's official website

Curriculum and academics
The first and second years of medical school at VCOM are primarily classroom based and focus on the basic sciences.  The school uses a system of "blocks" as opposed to semesters, with eight blocks occurring within the first two years.  Each block concerns a specific organ system, incorporating anatomy, physiology, microbiology, pharmacology, pathology, and osteopathic manipulative medicine (OMM) courses in relation to that system.  The blocks (in order) are: Foundations of Medicine, Musculoskeletal System, Neurological System and Special Senses, Cardiovascular and Pulmonary Systems, Gastrointestinal and Renal Systems, Reproductive and Endocrine Systems, Dermatologic Hemotologic and Lymphatic Systems, and Comprehensive Board Review.

While students at VCOM are educated in all basic medical sciences (as are their M.D. counterparts), VCOM students also receive approximately 200 extra hours of musculoskeletal/neuromuscular training.  VCOM develops partnerships to improve the spiritual and social well-being of the communities it serves.  In Virginia, South Carolina, and Alabama, VCOM partners with free clinics, faith based organizations and other non-profit organizations to provide preventive medicine and primary care outreach programs.  VCOM has permanent medical clinics located in Veron, Dominican Republic and Tegulcigalpa, Honduras, and in El Salvador.

The third and fourth years of training are clinically oriented, where students complete rotations, or clerkships, through various specialties of medicine. The core rotations are family medicine, internal medicine, pediatrics, OB/GYN, geriatrics, surgery, psychiatry, and primary care medicine.  These disciplines provide opportunities for students to develop clinical skills.

Campuses
VCOM currently operates five campuses: Blacksburg, Carolinas, Auburn, Monroe and Bluefield

VCOM-Virginia is located on 13 acres within the campus of Virginia Tech, in the Virginia Tech Corporate Research Center. The College operates within a public/private collaboration with Virginia Tech, sharing resources for the purposes of education, research and student activities. On campus, the main building consists of 60,000 square feet.  The Center for Simulation and Technology is located within a 22,000 square foot building, where training occurs with simulated patient encounters in several specialties.

VCOM-Carolinas is located on the edge of historic downtown Spartanburg, South Carolina. The campus is approximately 70,000 square feet and is situated on an 18-acre campus. Facility features include state-of-the-art anatomy lab and the Center for Simulation and Technology, offering standardized patient and manikin-based simulation education.

VCOM-Auburn is a 100,000 square foot, four-story, state-of-the-art campus  situated on 16 acres located on the Auburn University Campus, in Auburn, Alabama. The campus offers the nurturing feel of a small private college, but with access to resources and activities of a larger university community. The collaborative partnership with Auburn University student activities, events, research and the arts.

VCOM-Louisiana The fourth VCOM campus, which is a 100,000-square-foot, $31 million building on the campus of University of Louisiana at Monroe was completed in spring of 2020. Between 150-162 medical students enrolled in Fall 2020.

Bluefield University merged with VCOM in March of 2020. Bluefield University a Baptist liberal arts college located in Bluefield, Virginia.  The merger will allow Bluefield to continue to focus on its Christ-centered education but also focus on a health sciences curriculum.

Relationship with host institutions
The Virginia Campus is located in the Corporate Research Center, adjacent to the Virginia Tech campus.  As a part of a long-term agreement, students are granted the same benefits as Virginia Tech students in terms of use of the library, recreational facilities, student center, arts and theatre programs, intramural programs, and access to Virginia Tech football and other athletic event tickets.  The school features Tech's "Hokie Bird" mascot as its own, however the school is private and receives no state support from Virginia.  Additionally, the official medical school of Virginia Tech is the Virginia Tech Carilion School of Medicine and Research Institute granting the M.D. degree, which is located in Virginia Tech's Roanoke, Virginia campus.

The Carolinas Campus, until 2014, had a similar relationship with the private Wofford College, but currently participates in the "College Town Consortium" with five other local colleges. The annual White Coat Ceremony for first year medical students is held at nearby Converse College.

The Auburn Campus is located in the Auburn Research Park in Auburn, Alabama and has a partnership with Auburn University. The partnership is similar to that of Virginia Tech, students are able to use nearby facilities but they are separate entities. The campus started offering classes in Fall 2015.

Academic Sports and Osteopathic Medicine, in Blacksburg, Virginia are affiliated with VCOM-Virginia.

In 2017, VCOM-Carolinas will open Northside direct primary care, a college-affiliated clinic located on campus in Spartanburg, South Carolina. The clinic will be operated in part by Palmetto Proactive, and will be staffed by VCOM faculty physicians.

Graduate medical education
VCOM operates three fellowship programs, geriatric medicine, sports medicine, and osteopathic neuromusculoskeletal medicine.  All programs are accredited by the American Osteopathic Association. In addition, VCOM operates a residency program in family medicine in collaboration with Johnston Memorial Hospital

Research 
VCOM conducts multidisciplinary research in biomedical, clinical and community-based settings. Specific areas of research include: Sports Medicine, Concussion and Brain Trauma, Primary Care, Osteopathic Manipulative Medicine and Infectious Disease.  Supported by the Bradley Foundation, VCOM amplified its research in cancer, heart and neurological diseases as well as bioinformatics and primary care, by creating the Center for Bioinformatics and Genetics and the Primary Care Research Network.  Funding for new research projects provided in part by competitive internal funding programs, including the Research Eureka Accelerator Program (REAP) and the One Health Program.

References

External links 

Edward Via
Edward Via
Osteopathic medical schools in the United States
Buildings and structures in Blacksburg, Virginia
Virginia Tech
Educational institutions established in 2002
Education in Montgomery County, Virginia
Education in Spartanburg County, South Carolina
Edward Via
2002 establishments in Virginia
Edward Via
Edward Via
Edward Via
Education in Lee County, Alabama
Auburn University
Edward Via
Edward Via
Spartanburg, South Carolina